Pablo Torrijos Navarro (born 12 May 1992) is a Spanish track and field athlete who competes in the triple jump. He was the silver medallist at the 2015 European Athletics Indoor Championships.

Career
Born in Castellón de la Plana, he became involved with athletics as a youth and joined a local club, Playas de Castellon. He was the Spanish indoor youth champion in the triple jump in 2008 and went on to make his debut at the 2009 World Youth Championships in Athletics, but was eliminated in the qualifiers of both his speciality and the long jump as well. He also competed at the European Youth Olympic Festival that year, placing seventh in his qualifying group in the long jump.

He placed eighth at the 2010 Gymnasiade, then came sixth at the 2011 European Athletics Junior Championships after winning his first Spanish junior title. He established himself nationally in 2013 by winning the triple jump title at the Spanish Athletics Championships. He was the Spanish under-23 champion indoors and out that year and also placed eighth at the 2013 European Athletics U23 Championships.

Torrijos began to reach an international standard in 2014. He was sixth at the 2014 European Team Championships Super League and was a finalist at the 2014 European Athletics Championships, coming eighth.

Personal bests
Triple jump outdoor –  (2020)
Triple jump indoor –  (2020)
Long jump outdoor –  (2012)
Long jump indoor –  (2011)
Information from World Athletics athlete profile.

International competitions

1No mark in the final

National titles
Spanish Athletics Championships
Triple jump: 2013, 2014
Spanish Indoor Athletics Championships
Triple jump: 2014, 2015

References

External links
 
 
 
 
 

1992 births
Living people
Spanish male triple jumpers
Spanish male long jumpers
Olympic athletes of Spain
Olympic male triple jumpers
Athletes (track and field) at the 2016 Summer Olympics
Athletes (track and field) at the 2020 Summer Olympics
World Athletics Championships athletes for Spain
Sportspeople from Castellón de la Plana